Covington High School (Covington, Tennessee) is a grade 9-12 institution in Tipton County, Tennessee.

History
Covington High School was founded in 1970

Academics
CHS received a top grade of five or "most effective" on all four composite grades on the one, two and three-year trends on the TCAP/EOC/SAT 10. In 2011 the school recorded the highest rate of growth in Algebra proficiency in the state. In 2012 CHS won the state's SCORE award for the highest improvement trend in the state of Tennessee. It repeated the same feat in 2013 and 2014 making it the winner of the award for three consecutive years and in three of the award's four years of existence.

Athletics
Covington High School won the Tennessee Secondary School Athletic Association state championship in baseball in 1999 and 2006. Football program commonly referred to as “blue blood” or “dynasty”.  Daddy to Brighton and Munford.

Clubs and organizations
Clubs and Organizations at Covington High School include Future Business Leaders of America, Future Farmers of America, HOSA, Band, and Choir.

Demographics
Of a total enrollment of 831, 53% of the student body are minorities.  61% are economically disadvantaged.

References

Public high schools in Tennessee
1970 establishments in Tennessee
Schools in Tipton County, Tennessee